Dennis Craig Johnson (born June 19, 1958) is a former professional American football linebacker in the National Football League. He played six seasons for the Minnesota Vikings (1980–1985) and the Tampa Bay Buccaneers (1985).

References

1958 births
Living people
American football linebackers
Minnesota Vikings players
Players of American football from Flint, Michigan
Tampa Bay Buccaneers players
USC Trojans football players